The Irvine Transportation Center (also referred to as Irvine station) is a passenger rail and bus terminal in the Irvine Spectrum district of southeastern Irvine, California, United States. Located on the southwest end of the decommissioned Marine Corps Air Station El Toro, it is served by Amtrak California's Pacific Surfliner route, two Metrolink commuter rail lines, and multiple Orange County Transportation Authority (OC Bus) bus routes.

The $13 million Irvine Transportation Center opened on June 1, 1990, when Irvine was officially added to the Amtrak timetable as a stop on the route of the San Diegan (later renamed the Pacific Surfliner). On August 25, 2008, a new four-story parking structure was opened to expand available parking at the station by 1,500 spots.

Rail ridership
In FY2009, Irvine served about 3,000 total passengers daily for Metrolink and Amtrak.

Service

Rail

Buses

Former bus services
FlyAway Bus coach service to Los Angeles International Airport was formerly provided from the station, but was discontinued due to low ridership.

See also
Orange County Great Park

References

External links

Irvine Amtrak-Metrolink Station (USA RailGuide -- TrainWeb)

Buildings and structures in Irvine, California
Amtrak stations in Orange County, California
Bus stations in Orange County, California
Metrolink stations in Orange County, California
Railway stations in the United States opened in 1990